Torey Krug (born April 12, 1991) is an American professional ice hockey defenseman currently playing for the St. Louis Blues of the National Hockey League. Krug previously played for the Boston Bruins from 2012 to 2020.

Being undrafted, he played NCAA hockey at Michigan State University, also playing for the Indiana Ice of the United States Hockey League (USHL), winning the Clark Cup with the latter, the team's first-ever title.

In 2012, Krug was named the CCHA Player of the Year, and was a finalist for the Hobey Baker Award.

Playing career

Amateur
As a young child, Krug played in the 2003 Quebec International Pee-Wee Hockey Tournament with the Detroit Honeybaked minor ice hockey team. He was hosted by the Avoine family in Québec City during the 10 days of the tournament. He later played for the Belle Tire midget program in Michigan, and Krug skated in 59 regular season games for the Indiana Ice of the United States Hockey League (USHL), notching 47 points. Although he was undrafted into the USHL, Krug was extended an invitation by coach Jeff Blashill to try out for the Ice, eventually making the team. Krug also skated in 13 Clark Cup playoff games with seven points before capturing the championship. He was a member of the USHL All-Rookie Team and set the Indiana Ice record for points in a season by a defenseman in 2008–09.

Krug arrived at Michigan State University in the fall of 2009, and was initially slotted as a fifth or sixth defenseman on the roster. During the 2009–10 season, Krug was voted to the CCHA's All-Rookie Team. After skating in all 38 games, he finished the season second on the team in rookie scoring and led all CCHA first-year defensemen in scoring. Krug quickly gained a reputation as one of the CCHA's most offensive performers, and in advance of his sophomore season, was elected captain of the Spartans. As a sophomore, Krug was named to the First Team All-CCHA, and was voted the CCHA's Top Offensive Defenseman (he was the CCHA's top-scoring defenseman that year). In 2011–12, he was named to the All-CCHA Team for the second time, and was named a CCHA Player of the Year and Hobey Baker Award finalist. During the season, Krug was the top scoring defenseman in the CCHA, and shared the CCHA conference scoring title with Notre Dame's T. J. Tynan (29 points), becoming the first defenseman in the league to win a scoring title since Western Michigan's Wayne Gagner in 1986–87.

As the result of his accomplishments with Michigan State, Krug was among collegiate hockey's most sought-after free agents when he signed with the Boston Bruins in 2012.

Professional

Boston Bruins

On March 25, 2012, Krug was signed to an entry-level contract by the Boston Bruins, making his NHL debut on April 3, 2012, against the Pittsburgh Penguins. Appearing in two games with the Bruins, Krug finished with one assist and had an even plus-minus rating, averaging just over 17 minutes of ice time per game.

Krug spent the 2012–13 season with the Providence Bruins, where he was hampered by a sprained ankle until mid-January. After being called up from Providence on an emergency basis, he scored his first NHL goal during his first Stanley Cup playoff game in the Eastern Conference Semi-finals against the New York Rangers, becoming the first Bruins defenseman to score in his playoff debut since Glen Wesley in 1988. Krug followed this by scoring his second NHL goal during Game 2 of the same series, becoming the fourth player in Bruins history to score goals in his first two playoff games. At the conclusion of the series, he became the first rookie defenseman in League history to score four goals in his first five playoff games. In the 2013 postseason, Krug impressed by scoring four goals and recording six assists.

Krug started the 2013–14 season on the Bruins' opening night roster, and scored his first regular season NHL goal on October 5, 2013, against Jimmy Howard of the Detroit Red Wings. On November 25, playing against the Pittsburgh Penguins, he became the first rookie defenseman in Bruins history to score an overtime goal, which also proved to be his first NHL game-winning goal. Krug was frequently mentioned during the 2013–14 season as a strong contender for the Calder Memorial Trophy, awarded to the NHL's rookie of the year. He was named to the NHL's All Rookie Team and was the top scoring rookie defenseman in the league and was 4th in the league in the goals amongst rookies. His 14 goals and 26 assists helped the Bruins win the Presidents' Trophy, with the league's best record. Krug ended the 2014 Stanley Cup playoffs with 10 points in 12 games.

In the 2014–15 Boston Bruins season, Krug tallied 12 goals and 27 assists and recorded a +28 plus-minus, the best of his career. The following season, he produced 44 points on four goals and a career-high 40 assists.

On June 30, 2016, he re-signed a four-year deal worth an AAV of $5.25M with the Bruins. Krug ended the 2016–17 season ranking second among the team in assists and sixth in total points. In late April, Krug underwent surgery to repair a right shoulder injury and was expected to need six months to recover. Krug recovered enough to participate in the 2017 preseason but was injured in his second exhibition game, forcing him to miss the Bruins' season opener.

While playing in the 2018 Stanley Cup playoffs, Krug injured his left ankle during Game 4 against the Tampa Bay Lightning and was later ruled out for the rest of the series. By the time of the pre-season schedule, just before the 2018–19 started on October 3 with a road game against the 2018 Stanley Cup-winning Washington Capitals, Krug suffered a different injury to his left ankle in the last 2018–19 pre-season game against the Philadelphia Flyers, and was expected to be out for a three-week period for recovery and re-evaluation. On March 27, 2019, in a game against the New York Rangers, Krug became the all-time points leader by an American-born player in Boston Bruins history. On June 1, 2019, during game 3 of the 2019 Stanley Cup Finals against the St. Louis Blues, Krug became the first player in Bruins history to record four points in a Stanley Cup Final game.

St. Louis Blues
On October 9, 2020, the opening day of free agency, Krug left the Bruins after nine seasons and signed a seven-year, $45.5 million contract with the St. Louis Blues.

Personal life
Krug was born on April 12, 1991, in Livonia, Michigan, the son of Cheryl and Kyle Krug. Torey's brother, Adam, played college hockey at Adrian College and brother Matt played at Robert Morris University and Wayne State University. Another brother, Zak, plays college volleyball at Siena Heights University in Adrian, Michigan.

Krug is married to Melanie Krug. They have two daughters together. Krug is a Christian.

Torey admired the play of former Detroit Red Wings forward Pavel Datsyuk because "he's the most well-rounded player on the ice," and models his game after former teammate Zdeno Chára. He calls his father his largest hockey influence.

Krug graduated from Michigan State with a degree in Political Science in May 2017. He originally enrolled within the school's Finance program, but switched majors to Pre-Law after claiming he didn't enjoy the content. Krug was forced to switch programs again after signing with Boston due to the mandatory courses in Law not being available online, leading him towards Political Science. He completed his remaining 38 credits online during the NHL off-season over the course of the next five years.

Career statistics

Regular season and playoffs
Bold indicates led league

===International===

Awards, achievements and records

Records
 Most points by an American-born player in Boston Bruins history.
 First player in franchise history to record 4 points in a Stanley Cup Final game.

References

External links
 

1991 births
American men's ice hockey defensemen
Boston Bruins players
Ice hockey players from Michigan
Indiana Ice players
Living people
Michigan State Spartans men's ice hockey players
Michigan State University alumni
Providence Bruins players
St. Louis Blues players
Sportspeople from Livonia, Michigan
Undrafted National Hockey League players
AHCA Division I men's ice hockey All-Americans